Kenneth Raisma and Stefanos Tsitsipas were the defending champions but both players were no longer eligible to participate in junior events.

Axel Geller and Hsu Yu-hsiou won the title, defeating Jurij Rodionov and Michael Vrbenský in the final, 6–4, 6–4.

Seeds

Draw

Finals

Top half

Bottom half

External links 
 Draw

Boys' Doubles
Wimbledon Championship by year – Boys' doubles